Wayland Rural District was a rural district in Norfolk, England from 1894 to 1974.

It was formed under the Local Government Act 1894 based on the Wayland rural sanitary district, taking its name from the ancient Wayland hundred. It lay in the central southern part of the county.

In 1902 it took in the northern part of the disbanded Guiltcross Rural District, and in 1935 the eastern section of the disbanded Thetford Rural District (much of which had also been transferred from Guiltcross RD).

In 1974, the district was abolished under the Local Government Act 1972, and became part of the Breckland district.

Statistics

Parishes

References

Districts of England created by the Local Government Act 1894
Districts of England abolished by the Local Government Act 1972
Historical districts of Norfolk
Rural districts of England